Ah! Kai na 'moun antras is a 1966 Greek black and white comedy film directed and written by Stefanos Fotiadis and starring Maro Kontou, Dionyssis Papayannopoulos, Nikos Rizos and Giorgos Moutsios.

Plot

Frustrated and unemployed after being sexually harassed repeatedly, Stella poses as her brother, Alekos, an immigrant from Australia, hoping to get a job. She immediately wins the trust of her employers and soon gets promoted to management. Trouble starts when she falls in love with her boss' son.

Cast
Maro Kontou ..... Stella/Alekos
Dionyssis Papayannopoulos ..... Othon Belalis
Giannis Mihalopoulos Savas Makryheris
Nikos Rizos ..... Pavlos
Giorgos Moutsios ..... Andreas Belalis
Popi Deligianni ..... Georgia
Manolis Destounis ..... police officer
Giorgios Grigoriou ..... passer-by
Takis Christoforidis ..... Stella's boss
Loukas Milonas
Nana Skiada ..... Aphrodite Belali
Katerina Gioulaki ..... Vaso

See also
List of Greek films

External links

Ah! Kai na 'moun antras at cine.gr

1966 films
1966 comedy films
1960s Greek-language films
Greek comedy films